Prionolomia  is a genus of the squash bugs  belonging to the family Coreidae.

Species
 Prionolomia baudoni Dispons, 1962
 Prionolomia cardoni Lethierry, 1891
 Prionolomia euryptera (Breddin, 1903)
 Prionolomia expansa (Stål, 1871)
 Prionolomia fulvicornis (Fabricius, 1787)
 Prionolomia gigas Distant, 1879
 Prionolomia heros (Fabricius, 1794)
 Prionolomia malaya (Stål, 1865)
 Prionolomia porrigens (Walker, 1871)
 Prionolomia rudis Blöte, 1938
 Prionolomia truncata (Walker, 1871)
 Prionolomia villiersi Dispons, 1962
 Prionolomia yunnanensis Dispons, 1962

References

Mictini
Coreidae genera